Leopold Street Shule is a historic synagogue located at Rochester in Monroe County, New York. It was built in 1886 and is a rectangular brick building set on a high cut stone foundation measuring 45 feet by 85 feet. It was built by Eastern European Jews affiliated with the orthodox Beth Israel Congregation.  In 1973, the former synagogue was purchased by the Church of God and Saints of Christ, a Hebrew Israelite congregation.

It was listed on the National Register of Historic Places in 1974.

Gallery

See also
Congregation Ahavas Achim Anshi Austria

References

External links

Religious buildings and structures in Rochester, New York
Synagogues on the National Register of Historic Places in New York (state)
Former synagogues in New York (state)
Synagogues completed in 1886
National Register of Historic Places in Rochester, New York